is a Japanese musical ensemble associated with Rising Production, consisting of members Keiko (piano, keyboard, vocals), Yui (violin), and Mariko (cello).

Members

Current members

 Keiko — piano, keyboard, vocals
 Yui — violin
  — cello

Former members

 Emilee — violin
 Waka — flute

Discography

Extended plays

Singles

References

External links
 

Japanese pop music groups
Avex Group artists